Svetlana Nikolaeva (born 9 March 1984 in Leningrad) is a Russian pair skater. With partner Alexei Sokolov, she is the 1998 World Junior silver medalist. She later skated with Pavel Lebedev.

Programs 
(with Lebedev)

Competitive highlights

With Sokolov

With Lebedev

References

External links 
 

1984 births
Russian female pair skaters
Living people
World Junior Figure Skating Championships medalists